The Great and Secret Show is the debut album from the British metal band Devilment, released in 2014 on the Nuclear Blast label.

Development
In September 2013 the band entered Grindstone Studios in Suffolk with producer Scott Atkins, who had previously worked with bands including Cradle of Filth, Behemoth, Amon Amarth, Sylosis and Gama Bomb.

Track listing
The album contains 13 tracks, closing with an orchestral rendition of "Even Your Blood Group Rejects Me" by soundtrack maestro Spencer Creaghan. Another track is a cover of Midnight Oil's classic "Beds Are Burning", with guest vocals by band member Dani Filth's long-term friend Bam Margera of MTV's Jackass and Viva La Bam fame. Margera became involved after Dani attended Bam's wedding in Iceland and sang a live duet with him on an Anathema cover. This was after appearing on his TV show in which he helped destroy Bam's uncle's living room with a JCB digger.

Personnel

Band members
Dani Filth – vocals
Colin Parks – lead guitar
Daniel J Finch – guitar & Keyboards
Nick Johnson – bass
Aaron Boast – drums
Lauren Francis – keyboards, vocals

Additional personnel
Bam Margera – additional vocals on "Beds Are Burning"

2014 albums
Devilment albums